Mukdahan is one of Thailand's seventy-six provinces (changwat) and lies in upper northeastern Thailand, also called Isan. Neighboring provinces are (from south clockwise) Amnat Charoen, Yasothon, Roi Et, Kalasin, Sakon Nakhon, and Nakhon Phanom. To the east it borders the Mekong River, across which lies Savannakhet province of Laos to which it is joined by the Second Thai–Lao Friendship Bridge.

Geography
The province is in the Mekong valley. In the west of the province are the Phu Phan mountains, which are covered with thick forests.

National parks
There are a total of three national parks, ofwhich two, along with four other national parks, make up region 9 (Ubon Ratchathani) and Phu Pha Yon in region 10 (Udon Thani) of Thailand's protected areas. 
 Phu Pha Yon National Park, 
 Phu Sa Dok Bua National Park, 
 Phu Pha Thoep National Park,

Wildlife sanctuaries
There is one wildlife sanctuary, along with five other wildlife sanctuaries, make up region 9 (Ubon Ratchathani) of Thailand's protected areas.
 Phu Si Than Wildlife Sanctuary,

History
Lord Chandrasuriyawongse (เจ้าจันทรสุริยวงษ์) and his followers established a settlement at Baan Luang Phonsim (บ้านหลวงโพนสิม) near the Thad Ing Hang Stupa (พระธาตุอิงฮัง) on the left bank of the Mekong River in Laos. Several decades later he died.

Lord Chanthakinnaree (เจ้าจันทกินรี), his son, succeeded him as ruler. In B.E. 2310, a huntsman crossed over the Mekong and arrived along the right bank at the mouth of the stream Bang Muk (บังมุก), where he discovered a discarded realm complete with a monastery and seven sugar palms on the nearby riverbank. He found the area much better than the territories along the left side of the Mekong, and moreover at the mouth of the Bang Muk was an abundance of fish. He reported this to his ruler, Lord Chanthakinnaree. Chanthakinnaree led his followers across the Mekong to inspect the area and found that the area was indeed the remains of an ancient realm and in much better condition than any area along the left bank of the Mekong. He led his people from Baan Luang Phonsim to establish a settlement on the right bank at the mouth of Bang Muk.

When he began to clear away the forests to make way for his resettlement of the realm, he found two Buddha images beneath a sacred fig tree. The larger of the two was bricks-and-mortar, while the smaller one was made of fine iron. He had a new monastery built at once in the vicinity of the old, abandoned temple, and named it Wat Sri Moungkhoun (วัดศรีมุงคุณ) (cognate to Sri Mongkol (ศรีมงคล) in Central Thai, meaning 'Temple of Serene Auspices'). He constructed a palatial manse in the vicinity of the temple where he enshrined both Buddha images in a vihara. Later, the iron Buddha image (the smaller one) appeared to mysteriously reestablish itself beneath the fig tree where it had first been discovered and ultimately, after some three or four spectacles of this nature, began slowly sinking into the ground there until only the crown of the head could be seen. An alternate place of worship was built there to cover the site instead and the image itself was then named Phra Loup Lek (พระหลุบเหล็ก), or 'Venerable One of Ironmetal Who Shrouds Himself'. Today the site where Phra Loup Lek would submerge himself beneath the earth has been overtaken by the waters of the Mekong and washed away (presumably leaving only the shrine rescued and preserved at the front of the vihara at today's Wat Sri Mongkol South (วัดศรีมงคลใต้)).

As for the brick-and-mortar Buddha image enshrined in the vihara at the Sri Mongkol Temple, the inhabitants of the realm named it Phra Chao Ong Luang (พระเจ้าองค์หลวง), or 'Venerable Holy One', and made it the representative image of Wat Sri Mongkol, which itself was later renamed Wat Sri Mongkol South. This Buddha image has been associated with the settlement and realm ever since.

During the rebuilding of the realm, at around midnight there were reports of a transparent or translucent object glittering and bright spotted emerging from the seven sugar palms. It drifted in the air above the Mekong every night until near dawn when the crystal-like object would then float back into the seven trees from whence it came. Lord Chanthakinnaree named this auspicious omen Keo Mukdahan (แก้วมุกดาหาร) or the 'Pearlsmouth Crystal' as he had founded his realm on the banks of the Mekong where the mouth of the stream Bang Muk (or 'Pearlhaven') was located, in which people had discovered pearls (muk; มุก) in clams there. Mukdahan can refer to most any semiprecious stone resembling the pearl having a grey dull color, and not necessarily the pearl oyster, Pinctada margaritifera. Lord Chanthakinnaree then renamed the realm Mueang Mukdahan, as from the Fourth Month of the Year of the Pig, Year 1132 of the Chulasakarat (Minor Era), [Year 2313 of the Buddhasakarat (Buddhist Era or BE)] of the Buddhist calendar. The realm of Mukdahan at this stage covered both sides of the Mekong and reached the frontier lands of the Vietnamese (including the Laotian province of Savannakhet).

In B.E. 2321, during the Thonburi Period when King Taksin the Great extended his forces into the area of the Mekong River, he ordered Phra Mahakasut Suek and Chao Phya Chakri to dispatch their troops to the banks of the Mekong in order to suppress and unify the lords of all the realms great and small there on both sides of the Mekong together under the reign of the Kingdom of Thonburi, declaring Lord Chanthakinnaree the Phya Chanthasrisuraja Uparaja Mandhaturaj (พระยาจันทรศรีสุราชอุปราชามันธาตุราช), the first Lord of the Realm of Mukdahan and thereby officially naming the realm "Mueang Mukdahan".

The city of Mukdahan was founded in 1770 by Lord Chanthakinnaree of Phonsim. It was originally administered within Monthon Udon Thani, but in 1907 it became a district (amphoe) of Nakhon Phanom province. On 27 September 1982 Mukdahan was upgraded to provincial status.

In 2006, the Second Thai–Lao Friendship Bridge, from Mukdahan to Savannakhet, Laos was opened.

Economy
In 2018, the Airports Department of the Thai Ministry of Transport announced that it would spend six million baht on a Mukdahan International Airport feasibility study. If built, it would become Thailand's thirtieth international airport. The study is to be completed by March 2019.

Symbols
The provincial seal shows the Prasart Song Nang Sathit Palace, in which an opal is displayed on a tray.

The provincial tree and flower is Ochna integerrima.

The provincial slogan is "Skyscraping Ho Kaeo Tower, Phu Pha Thoep and Kaeng Kabao, eight ethnic minorities, famous sweet tamarind, large ancient kettledrum, origin of Lam Phaya, stunning view of the Mekong River, gateway to Indochina."

Administrative divisions

Provincial government
The province is divided into seven districts (amphoe). The districts are further divided into 53 subdistricts (tambon) and 493 villages (muban).

Local government
As of 26 November 2019 there are: one Mukdahan Provincial Administration Organisation and 25 municipal (thesaban) areas in the province. Mukdahan has town (thesaban mueang) status. Further 24 subdistrict municipalities (thesaban tambon). The non-municipal areas are administered by 29 Subdistrict Administrative Organisations - SAO (ongkan borihan suan tambon).

Human achievement index 2017

Since 2003, United Nations Development Programme (UNDP) in Thailand has tracked progress on human development at sub-national level using the Human achievement index (HAI), a composite index covering all the eight key areas of human development. National Economic and Social Development Board (NESDB) has taken over this task since 2017.

See also
Khit cloth

References

External links
TAT provincial page

Website of the province (Thai only)

 
Isan
Provinces of Thailand